This is a list of defunct airlines of the United States Virgin Islands.

See also
 List of airlines of the United States Virgin Islands
 List of airports in the United States Virgin Islands

References

United States Virgin Islands
Airlines, defunct